Kayaga Baroda Watongola is a Ugandan politician and legislator. She is the Member of Parliament for Kamuli Municipality in the 11th Parliament of Uganda.  She entered Parliament on an independent ticket.

Background and Education 
Baroda Watongola is the daughter of the late Hajjat Rehema Watongola, the former Member of Parliament for Kamuli Municipality, and Badiru Watongola, the Kamuli Municipality National Resistance Movement (NRM) chairperson.

Baroda Watongola is an alumnus of Kyambogo University from where she pursued a Bachelor's degree in Community Based Rehabilitation. She also possesses a diploma in the same course.

Career 
Baroda replaced her mother as contender for the Kamuli Municipality seat after her mother, Hajjat Rehema Watongola, succumbed to Covid 19 a few months away from the 2021 Uganda general elections in which she had intended to participate. Voters in Kamuli saw Baroda as her mum's perfect replacement.

She also received an endorsement from the party president of Forum for Democratic Change (FDC) Eng. Patrick Oboi Amuriat despite representing a different political inclination.

In the 2021 general elections, Baroda sought the MP seat on an independent ticket just like her mum had done. She won against Mastula Namatovu of National Resistance Movement, Mosses Bigirwa of the National Unity Platform (NUP) and Eng. Geoffrey Mugoye (another independent).

References 

Ugandan women in politics
Living people
Year of birth missing (living people)

Kyambogo University alumni